Patrick "Rik" Carey is a Bahamian music producer, singer, musician and the lead vocalist for the junkanoo band Baha Men, with the hit song "Who Let the Dogs Out".

Awards and nominations
Grammy Award as lead vocalist of Baha Men for the album Who Let the Dogs Out for Best Dance Recording
Billboard Awards for World Music Album of the Year
Billboard Awards for World Music Song of the Year
Nickelodeon Kids' Choice Awards for Favorite Band

Discography 
 2000 – Baha Men – Who Let the Dogs Out

See also
Baha Men

Sources 
http://www.myspace.com/rikcareybahamen

1977 births
Living people
People from Nassau, Bahamas
Bahamian singers